Greenall is a British locational or topographical surname which has been abbreviated from Green Hollow/Hole, Green Hill or Green Halgh. Notable people with the surname include:

Colin Greenall (born 1963), English footballer
Doug Greenall, English rugby league footballer and coach
Sir Gilbert Greenall, 1st Baronet (1806–1894), English businessman and politician
Gilbert Greenall, 1st Baron Daresbury (1867–1938), English businessman
Simon Greenall, British actor
Fin Greenall, English singer-songwriter, producer and DJ

See also
Greenall's, formerly a brewery in England
Greenhalgh (disambiguation)
Greenhill (disambiguation)

English-language surnames